(Exult, rejoice), K. 165, is a 1773 motet by Wolfgang Amadeus Mozart.

History
This religious solo motet was composed when Mozart was staying in Milan during the production of his opera Lucio Silla which was being performed there in the Teatro Regio Ducale. It was written for the castrato Venanzio Rauzzini, who had sung the part of the primo uomo Cecilio in Lucio Silla the previous year. While waiting for the end of the run (from 26 December 1772 to 25 January 1773), Mozart composed the motet for his singer, whose technical excellence he admired. Its first performance took place at the Theatine Church on 17 January 1773, while Rauzzini was still singing in Mozart's opera at night. Mozart made some revisions around 1780. On 30 May 1779, a Trinity Sunday, a revised version was performed by Francesco Ceccarelli at the Holy Trinity Church, Salzburg. Another revised version was intended for Christmas. The manuscripts of the two Salzburg versions were discovered in 1978 in St. Jakob, Wasserburg am Inn. In modern times, the motet is usually sung by a female soprano.

Structure
It has four sections:
Exsultate jubilate – Allegro (F major)
Fulget amica dies – Secco Recitative
Tu virginum corona – Andante (A major)
Alleluja – Molto allegro (F major)

Although nominally for liturgical use, the motet has many features in common with Mozart's concert arias, such as those drawn from his operas. Mozart also used elements of concerto form in this motet.

Libretto
Written in Latin, the author of the text is unknown but may have been Rauzzini.

Revisions
The text of the first Salzburg version differs in the first and second section.

The second Salzburg version differs from the previous only in the first section.

Discography
 Arleen Augér and the Bavarian Radio Symphony Orchestra, conducted by Leonard Bernstein, Deutsche Grammophon CD 431-791-2 (1991) and DVD 00440-073-4240 (2006)

References

External links 
 
 

Compositions by Wolfgang Amadeus Mozart
Motets
1773 compositions
Compositions in F major